Second Hand Band is a musical group from Moscow, Russia.

Second Hand Band was formed in 1999 and plays "Russian roots with Caribbean fruits" music, mixing various acoustic instruments with a mass of electronics. Their compositions often feature tabla and vibes, guitars and sitar, trumpet and harmonica with a slow beat (around 100 bpm) and mellow singing.

Second Hand Band are four: Dubchairman on the guitars and electronics; he is the main conductor of the band. Rovny plays the bass, acoustic guitar and electronics. He and Dubchairman handle the arrangements and programming. Aura – vocals. He also plays various ethnic instruments and writes most of the lyrics. Nail – the electric guitar and drum programming.

In the spring of 2005 Second Hand Band was named Best Lounge Band on the annual Russian Lounge Festival sponsored by Cafe Del Mar and Buddha Bar. The SHB gave a concert in the legendary Cafe Del Mar in August. The first European show took place in Spanish Empurio Brava in Mediterranean under the gentle summer sun and with a friendly audience.

Discography
 Ancient EP, Monoscript records, (2000)
 Drops, \Monoscript records, (2000)
 Dubbuterfly, (Экзотика records, 2003)
 Nightingale in a town

Cinema, theater and video
The band has released soundtracks for many Russian films including
Manga (2005), Boomer (2003), Gololed (2002) and TV-series Soldiers (2004).

In 2005, Joel Katinnen (Finland) introduced a theater performance "Arabian Night" with the music of SHB. The play was performed in Moscow and in Finland. A few compositions from this performance ("Come to me", "Ambient End") were later included in the album Nightingale In a Town.

References

External links
 Official Website
 Official Website in Russian
 SHB on Discogs

Musical groups from Moscow